Xanthene (9H-xanthene, 10H-9-oxaanthracene) is the organic compound with the formula CH2[C6H4]2O. It is a yellow solid that is soluble in common organic solvents. Xanthene itself is an obscure compound, but many of its derivatives are useful dyes.

Xanthene dyes

Dyes that contain a xanthene core include fluorescein, eosins, and rhodamines. Xanthene dyes tend to be fluorescent, yellow to pink to bluish red, brilliant dyes.  Many xanthene dyes can be prepared by condensation of derivates of phthalic anhydride with derivates of resorcinol or 3-aminophenol.

Further reading

See also
 Xanthone
 Xanthydrol

References

Dyes
Fungicides